Jean-Denis Gauthier (Montaigu 13 November 1810 - 1 December 1877) was a French bishop in Vietnam. He was a deacon at the seminary of the Missions-étrangères de Paris, left for Vietnam in 1835, was ordained there in 1842, and died at Nghi Diên (nôm: xã Đoài), Nghi Lộc District, Nghệ An Province in 1877.

References

1810 births
1877 deaths